Charniidae is a family of rangeomorphs. It is the only non-monotypic family of Rangeomorpha.

Distribution
From the Ediacaran of Australia, Canada, Russia and the United Kingdom, to the Cambrian of Canada.

Taxonomy
The family presents 5 genera:
 †Beothukis
 †Bomakellia
 †Charnia
 †Culmofrons
 †Paracharnia

Gallery

See also
Rangea

References

Rangeomorpha
Charniidae
Ediacaran life